Euschistus variolarius, the one-spotted stink bug, is a species of stink bug in the family Pentatomidae. It is found in the Caribbean Sea and North America.

References

Articles created by Qbugbot
Insects described in 1817
Pentatomini